Benzenesulfonic acid (conjugate base benzenesulfonate) is an organosulfur compound with the formula C6H6O3S. It is the simplest aromatic sulfonic acid. It forms white deliquescent sheet crystals or a white waxy solid that is soluble in water and ethanol, slightly soluble in benzene and insoluble in nonpolar solvents like diethyl ether. It is often stored in the form of alkali metal salts. Its aqueous solution is strongly acidic.

Preparation
Benzenesulfonic acid is prepared from the sulfonation of benzene using concentrated sulfuric acid:

This conversion illustrates aromatic sulfonation, which has been called "one of the most important reactions in industrial organic chemistry".

Reactions
Benzenesulfonic acid exhibits the reactions typical of other aromatic sulfonic acids, forming sulfonamides, sulfonyl chloride, and esters. The sulfonation is reversed above 220 °C.  Dehydration with phosphorus pentoxide gives benzenesulfonic acid anhydride ((C6H5SO2)2O).  Conversion to the corresponding benzenesulfonyl chloride (C6H5SO2Cl) is effected with phosphorus pentachloride.

It is a strong acid, being almost fully dissociated in water.

Benzenesulfonic acid and related compounds undergo desulfonation when heated in water near 200 °C.  The temperature of desulfonation correlates with the ease of the sulfonation: 
C6H5SO3H  +  H2O   →  C6H5OH  +  H2SO4

Because of that, sulfonic acids are usually used as a protecting group, or as a meta director in electrophilic aromatic substitution.

The alkali metal salt of benzenesulfonic acid was once used in the industrial production of phenol.  The process, sometimes called alkaline fusion, initially affords the phenoxide salt:

C6H5SO3Na  + 2 NaOH  →  C6H5ONa  +  Na2SO3
C6H5ONa  +  HCl  →  C6H5OH  +  NaCl
The process has been largely displaced by the Hock process, which generates less waste.

Uses
Salts of benzenesulfonic acid such as sodium benzenesulfonate (Ludigol) and monoethanolamine benzenesulfonate are used as surfactants in laundry detergent.

A variety of pharmaceutical drugs are prepared as benzenesulfonate salts and are known as besilates (INN) or besylates (USAN).

References

Benzenesulfonates
 
Phenyl compounds